Michael Ben David (born 26 July 1996) is an Israeli singer who represented  in the Eurovision Song Contest 2022. He performed the song "I.M" in the second semifinal. Israel placed 13th in the semi final failing to qualify to the grand Final.

Life and career 
Ben David was born in 1996 as the second of six siblings, to a Georgian Jewish father and mother who immigrated to Israel from Kyiv, Ukraine. He started taking voice lessons and studying dance under Israeli choreographer Oz Morag at a young age. He also worked as a singing waiter at a Tel Aviv bar. After completing his mandatory military service he attended the Beit Zvi School of Performing Arts, which has produced a number of former Israeli Eurovision artists like Rita, Shiri Maimon, and Harel Skaat, graduating in 2020. During his time at the school, he acted in plays and musicals.

The X Factor Israel and Eurovision 2022 
In October of 2021, Michael Ben David  auditioned for the fourth season of The X Factor Israel, which would be used to select Israel's representative for the Eurovision Song Contest 2022. Following a successful audition, he was paired up with Eurovision winner and Israeli popstar Netta. During the show he performed a number of songs, including ABBA's "Gimme! Gimme! Gimme! (A Man After Midnight)", Billie Eilish's "Idontwannabeyouanymore" and Pet Shop Boy's "It's a Sin". Ben David went on to win the final with his song "I.M" and represented Israel in the Eurovision Song Contest 2022.

Personal life  
As of 2022, Michael Ben David has been in a relationship with Roi Ram, whom he met while studying at Beit Zvi, for three years. The pair starred in a number of musicals together such as A Thousand and One Nights and King Solomon and Shlomo the Shoemaker, and the farce The Kitchen as well. Ram is still working in the musical theater world, working on a 2022 tour of an adaptation of The Wizard of Oz by L. Frank Baum. On the 11th of May 2022, the day before his Eurovision Song Contest 2022 semi-final, Ben David announced on Instagram that he had proposed to Ram in Turin, Italy, and that they were now engaged.

References 

1996 births
The X Factor winners
Eurovision Song Contest entrants for Israel
Eurovision Song Contest entrants of 2022
Living people
Israeli gay musicians
Israeli LGBT singers
Gay singers
Israeli people of Georgian-Jewish descent
Israeli people of Ukrainian-Jewish descent